The Island Bay National Wildlife Refuge is part of the United States National Wildlife Refuge System, located in the Cape Haze area of Charlotte County. The  refuge was established on October 23, 1908.

The Island Bay Wilderness (which was established on October 23, 1970) covers the same area as the refuge.

External links
 Island Bay National Wildlife Refuge
 Island Bay profile
 Island Bay National Wildlife Refuge at Wildernet

IUCN Category Ib
Protected areas of Charlotte County, Florida
National Wildlife Refuges in Florida
Protected areas established in 1908
1908 establishments in Florida